Cirrus Lingl (born November 2, 1998) is an American karateka. She won one of the bronze medals in the women's kumite +68 kg event at the 2019 Pan American Games held in Lima, Peru.

Career 

In June 2021, she competed at the World Olympic Qualification Tournament held in Paris, France hoping to qualify for the 2020 Summer Olympics in Tokyo, Japan. In November 2021, she competed in the women's +68 kg event at the World Karate Championships held in Dubai, United Arab Emirates.

She competed in the women's kumite +68 kg event at the 2022 World Games held in Birmingham, United States.

Lingl started learning karate at age seven at the Illinois Shotokan Karate Club. Her sister Skylar Lingl also competes in karate.

Achievements

References

External links 
 

Living people
1998 births
Place of birth missing (living people)
American female karateka
Pan American Games medalists in karate
Pan American Games bronze medalists for the United States
Karateka at the 2019 Pan American Games
Medalists at the 2019 Pan American Games
Competitors at the 2022 World Games
20th-century American women
21st-century American women